The 2019 Melon Music Awards ceremony, organized by Kakao M (a Kakao company) through its online music store Melon, took place on November 30, 2019 at the Gocheok Sky Dome in Seoul, South Korea. This is the eleventh ceremony in the show's history.

BTS took home all four most prestigious Daesang awards of the night.

Judging criteria

Performers and presenters 
The following individuals and groups, listed in order of appearance, presented awards or performed musical numbers.

Performances

Presenters

Winners and nominees 
Only artists who released music between December 1, 2018 and November 13, 2019 were eligible, and the nominees were selected by calculating the number of downloads, streams, and weekly Melon Popularity Award votes achieved by each artist. Voting for Top 10 Artists took place on the Melon Music website from October 30 through November 13, 2019. Voting for Category awards took place from November 14 through November 29, 2019.

Winners are listed first and highlighted in boldface, and indicated with a double dagger.

Main awards

Other awards

Notes

References

Melon Music Awards ceremonies
2019 music awards
Annual events in South Korea